A fluid ounce (abbreviated fl oz, fl. oz. or oz. fl., old forms ℥, fl ℥, f℥, ƒ ℥) is a unit of volume (also called capacity) typically used for measuring liquids. The British Imperial, the United States customary, and the United States food labeling fluid ounce are the only three that are still in common use, although various definitions have been used throughout history.

A US food labeling fluid ounce is exactly 30 mL.

Comparison to the ounce 
The fluid ounce is distinct from the (international avoirdupois) ounce as a unit of weight or mass, although it is sometimes referred to simply as an "ounce" where context makes the meaning clear (e.g., "ounces in a bottle"). A volume of pure water measuring one imperial fluid ounce has a mass of almost exactly one ounce.

Definitions and equivalences
Imperial fluid ounce
{|
|-
|height=120%|1 imperial fluid ounce 
|= 
|align=right|||imperial gallon
|-
|||= 
|align=right|||imperial quart
|-
|||= 
|align=right|||imperial pint
|-
|||= 
|align=right|||imperial cup
|-
|||= 
|align=right|||imperial gill
|-
|||= 
|align=right|8||imperial fluid drams
|-
|||= 
|align=right|||millilitres
|-
|||≈ 
|align=right|||cubic inches
|-
|||≈ 
|align=right|||US fluid ounces
|-
|||≈ 
|align=right colspan=2|the volume of 1 avoirdupois ounce of water
|}

US customary fluid ounce

{|
|-
|1 US fluid ounce ||= 
|align=right|||US gallon
|-
|||= 
|align=right|||US quart
|-
|||= 
|align=right|||US pint
|-
|||= 
|align=right|||US cup
|-
|||= 
|align=right|||US gill
|-
|||= 
|align=right|2||US tablespoons
|-
|||= 
|align=right|6||US teaspoons
|-
|||= 
|align=right|8||US fluid drams
|-
|||= 
|align=right|||cubic inches
|-
|||= 
|align=right|||millilitres
|-
|||≈ 
|align=right|||imperial fluid ounces
|}

US food labeling fluid ounce
For serving sizes on nutrition labels in the US, regulation 21 CFR §101.9(b) requires the use of "common household measures", and 21 CFR §101.9(b)(5)(viii) defines a "common household" fluid ounce as exactly 30 milliliters.
{|
|-
|30 millilitres ||≈ 
|align=right|||imperial fluid ounces
|-
|||≈ 
|align=right|||US customary fluid ounces
|-
|||≈ 
|align=right|||cubic inches
|}

History
The fluid ounce was originally the volume occupied by one ounce of some substance, for example wine (in England) or water (in Scotland). The ounce in question also varied depending on the system of fluid measure, such as that used for wine versus ale.

Various ounces were used over the centuries, including the Tower ounce, troy ounce, avoirdupois ounce, and ounces used in international trade, such as Paris troy, a situation further complicated by the medieval practice of "allowances", whereby a unit of measure was not necessarily equal to the sum of its parts.

In 1824, the British Parliament defined the imperial gallon as the volume of ten pounds of water at standard temperature. The gallon was divided into four quarts, the quart into two pints, the pint into four gills, and the gill into five ounces; thus, there were 160 imperial fluid ounces to the gallon.

This made the mass of a fluid ounce of water one avoirdupois ounce (28.35 g), a relationship which remains approximately valid today despite the imperial gallon's definition being slightly revised to be 4.54609 litres (thus making the imperial fluid ounce exactly 28.4130625 mL).

The US fluid ounce is based on the US gallon, which in turn is based on the wine gallon of 231 cubic inches that was used in the United Kingdom prior to 1824.  With the adoption of the international inch, the US fluid ounce became  gal × 231 in/gal × (2.54 cm/in) = 29.5735295625 mL exactly, or about 4% larger than the imperial unit.

References and notes

Ounce
Customary units of measurement in the United States
Imperial units
Alcohol measurement
Cooking weights and measures